The 2022 Judo Grand Slam Paris was held in Paris, France, from 5–6 February 2022.

Event videos
The event was aired freely on the IJF YouTube channel.

Medal summary

Medal table

Men's events

Women's events

Source Results

Prize money
The sums written are per medalist, bringing the total prizes awarded to 154,000€.

References

External links
 

2022 IJF World Tour
2022 Judo Grand Slam
Judo
Judo
Grand Slam Paris 2022
Judo
Judo